Phaea andrewsi is a species of beetle in the family Cerambycidae. It was described by Chemsak in 1999. It is known from Ecuador.

References

andrewsi
Beetles described in 1999